"Judgment" is episode 1 of season 2 of the television show Angel, broadcast on September 26, 2000 on the WB network. The episode was written by David Greenwalt, with a story from Greenwalt and series creator Joss Whedon, and directed by Michael Lange. In this episode, when Angel accidentally kills the demonic protector of a pregnant woman named Jo, he takes over as her champion. She is seeking protection for her unborn child from the mystical Tribunal, which requires her champion to defeat a challenger in single combat. Meanwhile, Wolfram & Hart have resurrected the long-dead vampire Darla to seek revenge against Angel.

Plot
The individual members of Angel Investigations are called to action. Cordelia, Wesley and Angel meet at a gym to stop some demons attempting a human sacrifice. Meanwhile Lilah visits Lindsey's office where Darla is listening to classical music. She can feel Angel nearby, and Lindsey wants revenge against him.

Back at Cordelia's apartment, which is their new base of operations after their offices were blown up last episode, the gang tries to figure out what Wolfram & Hart might have been trying to raise. Cordelia suddenly has a vision about a Prio Motu demon. At Wesley's suggestion they go to Caritas, a demon karaoke bar and safe haven, to find Wesley's demon informant Merl, who knows where to find the Prio Motu. Lorne, called the Host, is introduced. He is described by Wesley as an Anagogic demon who can see into the hearts and read the future of those who sing. The Host tries to convince Angel to do a number, but Angel refuses. Angel finds the Prio Motu demon along with a pregnant woman, Jo. He kills the demon, only to have Jo tearfully inform him that the demon was her protector - mentioning something called the tribunal. Angel tries to offer help, but she runs away from him. Back at the apartment, Cordelia and Wesley's attempts at comfort only make things worse. Angel, feeling guilty for having killed an innocent fighting on his own side, declares that he intends to take over the dead demon's mission, telling Wesley and Cordelia to find out what the Tribunal is. Angel tracks down Merl and roughs him up. The demon tells him there is a price on Jo, or more specifically, her baby - a daughter who is supposed to become someone powerful and important to the side of good. The price is tempting, but with the  Prio Motu defending her, no one could get to her. Angel picks up what Merl knows about where the Prio Motu would have been living and leaves.

Angel finds Gunn hunting vampires in a bad part of town and asks for help in finding the Prio Motu demon's hideout. They find the hideout and an important looking talisman. Angel asks Gunn to deliver the talisman to Wesley and Cordelia, leaving him to wait for Jo. When she appears Angel offers his help, and she tells him all she wants is to protect her unborn daughter. When he persists she asks him to help her find the "Coat of Arms" which might convince the Tribunal to call off whatever they're doing - the talisman Angel had just given to Gunn. When he confesses he already found it and sent it off to his friends, she tells him in exasperation to stop helping and turns to leave, only to find a demon coming through her door. Angel kills it, and they escape through the tunnels. Jo compares the Tribunal to a court and says the dead Prio Motu was going to be her champion. More demons attack, and the two are separated.

Angel arrives at the house, Gunn having already delivered the Coat of Arms and left, but Jo never showed. He and Cordelia talk about how they got cocky - treating the news that Angel had a chance to become human as if it meant the fight was over. Wesley interrupts with more information about the Tribunal, including the fact that it's a fight to the death. To get more information, Angel is forced to sing karaoke in front of the Host. He sings "Mandy", for which the Host tells him the Trial will be wherever Jo is - though he offers no conclusive answer to whether or not Angel will be able to save her. As he sets off to find her, the trial begins and with no Champion and no Coat of Arms, Jo is told her life is forfeit, but Angel arrives in time and throws down the Coat of Arms, declaring himself her champion. Angel is stabbed in the ensuing fight, and the Tribunal declares his opponent to have won, but Angel pulls out the sword and cuts off the other Champion's head. The Tribunal grants Jo and her daughter protection until the child comes of age.

Angel returns to Cordelia's apartment and removes the board they had been keeping track of their kills on. Wesley agrees that keeping score was a mistake - it's a job, not a race. Angel goes to visit Faith, now serving a long prison term, and they talk about redemption.

Production details
 This is one of the first episodes on Angel in which demons are shown of being capable of doing good. Angel experiences guilt after killing Jo's demon protector because he killed "an innocent being" and "a soldier like [him]self", and because it never occurred to him that a demon could be either of those things.

References

External links 

 

Angel (season 2) episodes
2000 American television episodes
Television episodes written by David Greenwalt